Sir Isaac Newton Sixth Form is a specialist maths and science sixth form with free school status located in Norwich, owned by the Inspiration Trust. It has the capacity for 480 students aged 16–19. It specialises in mathematics and science.

History 
Prior to becoming a Sixth Form College the building functioned as a fire station serving the central Norwich area until August 2011 when it closed down. Two years later the Sixth Form was created within the empty building with various additions being made to the existing structure.

Curriculum

At Sir Isaac Newton Sixth Form, students can study a choice of either Maths, Further Maths, Biology, Chemistry, Physics, Computer Science, Environmental Science, Geography or Psychology. Additionally, students can also study any of the subjects on offer at the partner free school Jane Austen College, also located in Norwich and specialising in humanities and English.

References

External links
 
Ofsted reports

Free schools in England
Schools in Norwich
Education in Norfolk
2013 establishments in England
Inspiration Trust
Educational institutions established in 2013
Mathematics education in the United Kingdom